HKT48 (read "H.K.T. Forty-eight") is a Japanese idol group produced by Yasushi Akimoto. HKT48 is named after the Hakata-ku, Fukuoka city of Fukuoka Prefecture, where Akimoto originally intended to base the group. The group currently performs at City Bank HKT48 Theater in Fukuoka and has sold nearly 4 million copies of CDs in Japan.

History 

Plans for a group entitled HKT48 were first revealed by AKB48 producer Yasushi Akimoto on November 19, 2008. HKT48 was officially announced on May 1, 2011 at an AKB48 handshake event. The group was the fourth AKB48 sister group to be launched, after the groups SKE48, SDN48 and NMB48. While the group took its name from its proposed base location of Hakata-ku, Fukuoka, HKT48 was eventually based at a theater in the Hawks Town Mall in neighboring Chūō-ku, Fukuoka. This location is next to the Fukuoka Yahoo! Japan Dome. In addition, it was announced that the group would be accepting applications from girls aged between 11 and 22. The first round of the first HKT48 audition took place from May 31, 2011, and successful applicants took part in the second round of auditions, consisting of a singing and dancing test, in the first half of July 2011. The final auditions were held at Hilton Fukuoka Sea Hawk Hotel on July 10 and 24 candidates successfully passed the final.

After undergoing dance and vocal lessons, HKT48's 21 first-generation members were first revealed at an AKB48 handshake event on October 23, 2011 at Seibu Dome. Of these 21 members, 17 were junior high school students or below, and two were elementary-school students. The youngest member of the group, Natsumi Tanaka, was born in 2000, and was 11 years old at the time of the announcement. She said that "joining AKB48 is my ambition since I was 5 years old, so it feels like a dream to be in this group." The oldest member was Yūko Sugamoto, who was 17 years old at the time of the announcement.

They debuted at HKT48 Theater on November 26, 2011, and have been performing sets of songs entitled "Te o Tsunaginagara", which had been originally performed by SKE48 Team S and KII.  On December 31, 2011, 16 members appeared on the stage of the 62nd edition of "NHK Kōhaku Uta Gassen", as one of the sister groups of AKB48. On March 4, 2012, the first 16 members were selected to form Team H, and appeared on the stage.  On June 20, 2012, Rino Sashihara from AKB48 transferred to HKT48 and as of 2012 was HKT48's oldest member.

On June 23, 2012, the final auditions for the second generation were held, and 34 candidates out of 48 finalists has passed the final.  On August 18, 2012, the management announced that five members, three from Team H, Komori, Sugamoto and Taniguchi, and two Kenkyusei – Eto and A. Nakanishi, would be resigning from HKT48 "due to personal reasons".  On August 24, 2012, it was announced on the first day of the AKB48 concert at Tokyo Dome that Aika Ota, one of AKB48 Team A members, would be transferred to HKT48.  On September 23, 2012 HKT48's second generation research students were announced.

HKT48 released their debut single, "Suki Suki Skip!" on March 20, 2013 under the Universal Sigma record label.

On March 31, 2016, the existing theater located at Hawks Town Mall was closed, with a special farewell performance. A new temporary theater opened in Nishitetsu Hall, also in Chūō-ku, Fukuoka, on April 28, 2016.

In mid-2018, 10 members of HKT48 joined Produce 48, a South Korean competition television show on Mnet to form a girl group. Members Sakura Miyawaki and Nako Yabuki finished in 2nd and 6th placed respectively, both earning themselves a spot to debut in IZ*ONE.

On November 2, 2020, the new and permanent theatre was opened in BOSS E・ZO FUKUOKA. The theatre was named "Nishi-Nippon City Bank HKT48 Theater".

On May 15, 2021, both Sakura Miyawaki and Nako Yabuki returned to HKT48. Sakura Miyawaki also announced her graduation, which took place on June 27, 2021.

On October 16, 2022, during HKT48 11th anniversary concert, Nako Yabuki announced her graduation from the group with graduation concert would be held in Spring 2023.

Members 
Team H's formation was announced at HKT48 theater on March 4, 2012. At the conference, it was also announced that 16 members were selected and 5 members remained as a trainee. On January 11, 2014, during their first exclusive concert tour in Ōita, a theater manager Rino Sashihara announced a new Team KIV and promotion of 17 members from the trainees. On March 30, 2016, the group announced that Team TII was formed and 10 trainees were promoted from 3rd generation and 2nd Generation draft members.

On November 26, 2017, the group announced that all 10 trainees from 4th generation were promoted and assigned to the existing 3 teams, one to Team H, two to Team KIV, and seven to Team TII.

On April 9, 2021, the group announced that 4 trainees from the 5th generation were promoted and assigned to two teams, two to Team H and two to Team KIV.

On October 16, 2022, the group will end its current three-team system with Team TII ceased and start its two-team activities with Team H and Team KIV in February 2023. It is also announced a new captain for both Teams H and Team KIV respectively.

Team H 
Team H is associated with the color Sulu Green, the current captain is Yuka Akiyoshi.

Team KIV 
Team KIV is associated with the color Charlotte Blue, the current captain is Aoi Motomura.

Team TII 

Team TII is associated with the color Golden Yellow, the current captain is Emiri Yamashita and the current co-captain is Hazuki Hokazono.

Kenkyuusei members

Graduated members

Team H

Team KIV

Team TII

Kenkyuusei members

Transferred members 
These members were transferred from HKT48 to a different group.

Transferred to AKB48

Transferred to SKE48

Member Timeline

Discography

Studio albums

Singles

Songs recorded on AKB48 singles

Filmography

Television shows 
 HKT48 no Odekake! (TBS, 2013–2017)
 Majisuka Gakuen 0 Kisarazu Rantō Hen (NTV and Hulu Japan, November 28, 2015)
 HKT48 vs NGT48 Sashikita Gassen (NTV and Hulu Japan, January 12 – March 29, 2016)
 HKT Variety 48 (2012-2019)

Films 
 Ozaki Shihainin ga Naita Yoru Documentary of HKT48 (2015)

Notes

References

External links 

  

 
AKB48 Group
Culture in Fukuoka Prefecture
Japanese girl groups
Japanese idol groups
Japanese pop music groups
2011 establishments in Japan
Musical groups established in 2011
Universal Music Japan artists
Musical groups from Fukuoka Prefecture